A pochade (from French poche, pocket) is a type of sketch used in painting. As opposed to a croquis, which is line art, a pochade captures the colors and atmosphere of a scene. 

Generally, pochades use a small, portable format. Robert Henri and James Wilson Morrice, for example, painted such sketches on small wood panels that would fit in a coat pocket along with oil paint tubes. Others artists, such as landscape painter John Constable, made pochades the size of the intended painting. The French artist Alphonse Chigot produced a series of pochades of the towns people of Valenciennes that he sold from his studio which were later collected and publish in two volumes.

References

Drawing